United Supermarkets Arena (previously the United Spirit Arena) is a multipurpose arena on the campus of Texas Tech University in Lubbock, Texas. The 15,300-seat arena opened in 1999 and is home to the Texas Tech Red Raiders basketball, Texas Tech Lady Raiders basketball, and Texas Tech Red Raiders women's volleyball teams.

History
The City of Lubbock proposed replacing the Lubbock Municipal Coliseum with a new arena named after Buddy Holly. The proposed Buddy Holly Arena was to be located next to the Lubbock Memorial Civic Center in downtown Lubbock, not on the Texas Tech University campus. A public referendum for a tax increase to build the arena failed to pass by as few as 600 votes. Texas Tech decided to move construction to an on-campus facility with private donations on the university's campus.

The arena was financed from a $500 million fundraising endeavor undertaken by John T. Montford, the first chancellor of the Texas Tech University System. Groundbreaking began on March 26, 1997. The arena opened on October 1, 1999, at a cost of $62.775 million.

With a total of 15,300 seats, United Supermarkets Arena is slated to become the largest indoor collegiate sports arena in the state, pending the proposed demolition of University of Texas at Austin's Frank Erwin Center

Design
The arena features a Spanish Renaissance exterior facade, matching architectural style of the rest of the Texas Tech University campus. Architects for the project included Joe D. McKay AIA Architects, and Rosser International. Hill International was the project manager, and the general contractor was Centex Construction Co.

Standing at the southeast entrance of the arena is the eight-story Victory Tower. At , Victory Tower is the 16th-tallest structure in Lubbock.

Naming rights
Lubbock-based supermarket chain United Supermarkets purchased the naming rights to the facility under a 20-year, $10 million naming-rights agreement with Texas Tech University in 1996. Until 2014, the arena was known as United Spirit Arena. Following a 10-year, $9.45 million naming-rights extension, the arena was renamed United Supermarkets Arena. Funds from the 10-year naming rights extension will go towards facility renovations.

Usage

Texas Tech Red Raiders basketball

 The first basketball game was played in the arena on November 19, 1999. The Texas Tech Red Raiders lost 68–60 to the Indiana Hoosiers, coached by Naismith Memorial Basketball Hall of Fame inductee Bob Knight, who would later become the head coach of Red Raiders basketball team.
 On January 1, 2007, a 70–68 defeat of the New Mexico Lobos by the Texas Tech Red Raiders marked the 880th total win for Bob Knight, making him the winningest coach in men's college basketball history.
 A Big 12 Conference record for student attendance was set February 25, 2014, against Kansas State.

NCAA Tournaments
NCAA Division I Women's Basketball First and Second Rounds: 2000, 2001, 2002, 2003, 2009, 2013, and WNIT Tournament First Round 2023.

Gymnastics
On October 2, 2016, the arena hosted the Kellogg's Tour of Gymnastics Champions.

WNBA
On May 4, 2007, the Houston Comets with former Lady Raiders Sheryl Swoopes and Erin Grant played a Women's National Basketball Association  exhibition game against the Detroit Shock with Plenette Pierson, also a former Lady Raider.

WWE
United Supermarkets Arena hosted WWE Raw (the first Raw ever to be hosted in Lubbock) in May 2006.

Concerts

See also
 List of NCAA Division I basketball arenas

References

External links

 Official Website
 United Spirit Arena – Texas Tech Athletics
 Pictures Website

Basketball venues in Texas
College basketball venues in the United States
College volleyball venues in the United States
Gymnastics venues in Texas
Indoor arenas in Texas
Music venues in Lubbock, Texas
Texas Tech Lady Raiders basketball venues
Texas Tech Red Raiders basketball venues
Basketball venues in Lubbock, Texas
Volleyball venues in Texas
Sports venues completed in 1999
1999 establishments in Texas